Baron de Mauley, of Canford in the County of Dorset, is a title in the Peerage of the United Kingdom. It was created on 10 July 1838 for the Whig politician the Hon. William Ponsonby, who had earlier represented Poole, Knaresborough and Dorset in the House of Commons. He was the third son of the 3rd Earl of Bessborough, an Anglo-Irish peer, and the husband of Lady Barbara Ashley-Cooper, one of the co-heirs to the ancient barony by writ of Mauley (or Maulay), which superseded the feudal barony the caput of which was at Mulgrave Castle, Yorkshire, which barony by writ had become extinct in 1415. His son, later the second Baron, sat as Member of Parliament for Poole and Dungarvon.

, the title is held by the latter's great-great-grandson, the seventh Baron, who succeeded his uncle in 2002. He is one of the ninety elected hereditary peers that remain in the House of Lords after the passing of the House of Lords Act 1999, and sits as a Conservative. He was elected in 2005 and thereby became the first hereditary peer having succeeded to his title after the House of Lords Act of 1999, to have obtained an elective hereditary peers seat in the House of Lords.

The Hon. Ashley Ponsonby, younger son of the first Baron, was a Liberal politician. Another member of this branch of the Ponsonby family was the Conservative politician Sir Charles Ponsonby, 1st Baronet. He was the son of the Hon. Edwin Charles William Ponsonby, fifth son of the second Baron de Mauley.

Former Air Vice Marshal John Ponsonby is the son of officer, diplomat and politician Myles Ponsonby, and a grandson of Victor Coope Ponsonby, the fourth son of the Hon. Edwin Charles William Ponsonby.

Barons de Mauley (1838)
William Francis Spencer Ponsonby, 1st Baron de Mauley (1787–1855)
Charles Frederick Ashley Cooper Ponsonby, 2nd Baron de Mauley (1815–1896)
William Ashley Webb Ponsonby, 3rd Baron de Mauley (1843–1918)
Maurice John George Ponsonby, 4th Baron de Mauley (1846–1945)
Hubert William Ponsonby, 5th Baron de Mauley (1878–1962)
Gerald John Ponsonby, 6th Baron de Mauley (1921–2002)
Rupert Charles Ponsonby, 7th Baron de Mauley (born 1957)

The heir presumptive is the present holder's brother, the Hon. (Ashley) George Ponsonby (born 1959).

Male-line family tree

See also
Earl of Bessborough
Baron Ponsonby of Imokilly
Baron Sysonby
Baron Ponsonby of Shulbrede
Ponsonby baronets of Wootton
Lady Caroline Ponsonby

Notes and references

Notes

References

 

Baronies in the Peerage of the United Kingdom
 
Noble titles created in 1838
Noble titles created for UK MPs